John Gordon Pimlott (21 January 1939 – January 1992) was an English footballer, who played as an inside forward in the Football League for Chester.

References

Chester City F.C. players
Bury F.C. players
Radcliffe F.C. players
Association football inside forwards
English Football League players
1939 births
1992 deaths
People from Radcliffe, Greater Manchester
English footballers